Prince Avenue Christian School (PACS) is a private, covenant Christian school located on 2201 Ruth Jackson Road in Bogart, Georgia, United States, with an annual enrollment between 800 and 850 students. PACS was voted the Best Private School in Athens (Athens Choice Awards) and the Best Christian High School in Athens (Niche) for four consecutive years: 2018/19, 2019/20, 2020/21 and 2021/22.

History 
The school opened in 1978 in downtown Athens and was initially housed in Prince Avenue Baptist Church. Now located on a 60-acre campus in Oconee County, the school serves students from thirteen surrounding counties representing sixty-eight different churches.

Vision and Mission Statements 
Vision: Guided by God’s Word as our foundation, we aspire to be the preferred choice for Christian families in the greater Athens area by providing a premier college preparatory education while discipling students to grow in a personal relationship with Jesus Christ.”

Mission: "To partner with Christian families to provide scripturally based discipleship while pursuing excellence in academics, fine arts, and athletics from a biblical worldview."

Campus 
The school is located on 65 acres in Oconee County in Northeast Georgia. Buildings include over 50,000 sq ft of instructional space including a weight training facility, band room, and practice and competition fields for athletics.

Academics 
PACS is a college preparatory school offering a variety of college placement, honors, Advanced Placement (AP), and dual enrollment classes. The school's robust DE program provides over 40 college credit hours students can take on campus from adjunct college instructors. PACS is accredited by the Southern Association of Independent Schools (SAIS)/Southern Association of Colleges and Schools (SACS), and the Association of Christian Schools International (ACSI), and an affiliate member of the Georgia Independent School Association (GISA).

Fine Arts 
All fine arts classes are based on state or national standards and are taught at the college preparatory level. Programs include: band, visual arts, drama, and performing arts. Fine arts students travel nationally and internationally to attend workshops, performances, and to minister to others in pursuit of the great commission.

Athletics 
The school is a member of the Georgia High School Association (GHSA) and has elementary and middle school athletic programs that feed into 17 varsity sports. The school has won multiple state and region championships.

Biblical Discipleship 
As a Christian, covenant school, admission standards require at least one parent of each student to be a professing believer in Jesus Christ. School days begin with corporate prayer, students receive daily biblical instruction, and all students and faculty attend chapel together weekly.

References

External links
 http://princeave.org/about-us

1978 establishments in Georgia (U.S. state)
Baptist schools in the United States
Christian schools in Georgia (U.S. state)
Educational institutions established in 1978
Private elementary schools in Georgia (U.S. state)
Private middle schools in Georgia (U.S. state)
Private high schools in Georgia (U.S. state)
Schools in Oconee County, Georgia